OK Mein Dhokhe is a 2016 Indian Hindi-language drama thriller film, directed by Utpal S. Chaudhary, under the banners of Meow Music Company and Lotus Media & Films. The film was released on 18 March 2016.

Cast
Zoya Rathore (lead role)
Sapan Krishna (lead role)
Vaidhei Singh
Megha Verma
Ravi Thakur
Milan Singh Rajput
Saniya Chaudhary
Natatasha
Tabassum Saikh
Raja Jani
Ranjan Ji
Chinni Chetan
Vijay Raj Menom

References

External links
 

2010s Hindi-language films
2016 films
Indian thriller drama films
Films set in Mumbai
2016 thriller drama films
2016 drama films